Sam Groth was the defending champion, but lost in the quarterfinals to Denis Kudla.

Dustin Brown won the title after defeating Lu Yen-hsun 7–6(7–5), 6–1 in the final.

Seeds

Draw

Finals

Top half

Bottom half

References
 Main Draw
 Qualifying Draw

Aegon Manchester Trophy - Singles
2016 Singles